Hip Twist is an album by organist Shirley Scott featuring saxophonist Stanley Turrentine which was recorded in 1961 and released on the Prestige label.

Reception

The Allmusic review stated " Hip Twist, like nearly all of the Shirley Scott and Stanley Turrentine albums, is an underappreciated gem".

Track listing 
All compositions by Shirley Scott except as indicated
 "Hip Twist" (Stanley Turrentine) - 5:17 
 "At Last" (Mack Gordon, Harry Warren) - 5:25  
 "Rippin' an' Runnin'" - 5:19   
 "The Very Thought of You" (Ray Noble) - 3:46
 "Violent Blues"- 6:11   
 "That's All" (Bob Haymes,  Alan Brandt) - 6:16  
 "All Tore Down" (Michael Edwards) - 5:32

Personnel 
 Shirley Scott - organ
 Stanley Turrentine - tenor saxophone
 George Tucker - bass
 Otis Finch - drums

References 

1962 albums
Albums produced by Esmond Edwards
Albums recorded at Van Gelder Studio
Prestige Records albums
Shirley Scott albums